Hemsedal Bygdatun is a small museum in Ulsåk in Hemsedal municipality in Viken county, Norway. The museum is a subsidiary of Hallingdal Museum.

References

External links
 Official site, — in Norwegian
 Kulturnett.no, — in Norwegian

 

Hallingdal
Museums in Viken
Local museums in Norway